Rocanlover (Misspelled: "Rock and Lover") is the second studio album by the Mexican alternative rock band Zoé.
Released in 2003, it was produced by Phil Vinall, who had previously worked with the likes of Placebo, Elastica, and Pulp. This album counted with the main singles "Peace and Love", "Love", and "Veneno". By this point, their musical style was clearly defined and easily recognizable, as was their style of mixing Spanish and English in their lyrics.

Track listing

References

Zoé albums
2003 albums